The OFC U-20 Championship 1994 was held in Fiji. It also served as qualification for the 1995 FIFA World Youth Championship.

Teams
The following teams entered the tournament:

 
  (host)

Group stage

Group A

Group B

Semifinals

Third place match

Final

Qualification to World Youth Championship
The tournament winner qualified for the 1995 FIFA World Youth Championship.

External links
Results by RSSSF

OFC U-20 Championship
Under 20
1994
1994 in Fijian sport
1994 in youth association football